Austin Van "Chick" Catterton Sr. (January 26, 1913 – October 4, 1993) was a one-term mayor of Melbourne, Florida from 1953 to 1954. He was a broadcaster and musician.

He was born in Walterboro, South Carolina on January 26, 1913, the son of G. M. Catterton and Lattie Catterton. He moved to Florida in 1945.

On January 10, 1946, he married Claudia Claire Strange.

From 1949 until at least 1952, he was general manager of Melbourne Broadcasting Corporation, owner of WMMB. In 1956, he was vice president, general manager and news director. He left WMMB, and in 1958, he co-founded WMEG. He was president, general manager and news director of Mel-Eau Broadcasting Corporation.

On July 22, 1965, he co-founded the Melbourne Municipal Band.

Associations 
 Member, Masons, Melbourne Lodge #143
 Melbourne Commandery 41, Knights Templar
 Member, Melbourne Kiwanis Club
 Charter member, Bahia Temple AAONMS

References 

1913 births
1993 deaths
American bandleaders
American broadcasters
American Freemasons
United States Marine Corps personnel of World War II
Mayors of Melbourne, Florida
People from Walterboro, South Carolina
United States Army soldiers
United States Marines
20th-century American musicians
20th-century American politicians